The Tlʼesqox (or Toosey) First Nation is a Tsilhqotʼin community located west of the Fraser Canyon in the Chilcotin region of the Canadian province of British Columbia.  It is a member of the Carrier-Chilcotin Tribal Council, which includes both Tsilhqotʼin and Carrier (Dakelh) communities.

The Tlʼesqox First Nation reserve community and offices are located at Riske Creek, which is on the Fraser River just southwest of the city of Williams Lake.

Chief and Councillors
Chief Frances Laceese; Coun. Clayton Palmatier; Coun. Georgina Johnny; Counc. Violet Tipple

Indian Reserves

Indian reserves under the administration of the Tlʼesqox First Nation are:
Baptiste Meadow Indian Reserve No 2, on Riske Creek, 5 km northwest of the Riske Creek PO, 226.60 ha. 
Toosey Indian Reserve No. 1, on Riske Creek, 6.5 km west of its mouth on the Fraser River.  2339.10 ha. 
Toosey Indian Reserve No. 1A, west of and adjoining IR No. 1, 11.80 ha. 
Toosey Indian Reserve No. 3, 5 km east of the mouth of Riske Creek, 5.0 ha.

See also
Chilcotin language
Tsilhqot'in Tribal Council
 2016 Census, Toosey 1
 Regional Community Literacy Plan,2011-2012

References

Tsilhqot'in governments